The Four Corners Generating Station is a 1,540 megawatt coal-fired power plant located near Fruitland, New Mexico, on property located on the Navajo Nation that is leased from the Navajo Nation government.

Description

The Four Corners Generating Station originally consisted of five units with a total rated generating capacity of about 2,040 megawatts. Units 1, 2, and 3 (permanently shut down in 2014 as part of a $182 million plan for Arizona Public Service Co. to meet environmental regulations) had a combined generating capacity of 560 megawatts while units 4 and 5 each have a generating capacity of 770 MW. Units 1, 2 and 3 opened in 1963–64 and Units 4 and 5 opened in 1969–70.

The Arizona Public Service Company (APS) owned 100% of Units 1, 2, and 3, while Units 4 and 5 are operated by APS but owned by around five companies, with APS owning 70% in 2014, Public Service Company of New Mexico 13%, Salt River Project 10%, and Tucson Electric Power 7%. The station is cooled using water from Morgan Lake, which is man-made and is replenished by about 28 million gallons of water each day from the San Juan River. The plant burns sub-bituminous coal delivered from the nearby Navajo Coal Mine by the Navajo Mine Railroad.

The Navajo Transitional Energy Company (NTEC) bought the mine from BHP, three mines in Montana and Wyoming, and 7% of Four Corners Generating Station. In 2020, Arizona Public Service announced plans to decommission the Four Corners Generating Station, leaving no prospect for the mine and the railroad.

History
The Four Corners Generating Station was constructed on property that was leased from the Navajo Nation in a renegotiated agreement that will expire in 2041. Unit 1 and Unit 2 were completed in 1963, Unit 3 was completed in 1964, Unit 4 was completed in 1969, and Unit 5 was completed in 1970.

Apparently the astronauts of the Mercury program reported that they could see two human-constructed things from space: one was the Great Wall of China and the other was the "plume streaming from Four Corners Power Plant."

In 1975, New Mexico enacted a tax on the generation of electricity and an in-state credit such that only electricity exported out-of-state was subject to the tax. Objections to this tax led to two United States Supreme Court cases. In Arizona v. New Mexico (1976), on a motion seeking to invoke the original jurisdiction of the Supreme Court, the court initially decided not to be involved and denied the motion, leaving the matter to the state court. The owners of Four Corners filed an action in state court to declare the tax invalid, leading to the United States Supreme Court decision Arizona Public Service Co. v. Snead (1979), which held that the tax violated the Supremacy Clause of the United States Constitution.

In November 2010, APS announced that it would purchase the SCE share of Units 4 and 5, add air pollution control systems to these units, and shutdown Units 1, 2, and 3.  This transaction and shutdown were completed in 2013. Following the shutdown of Units 1 through 3, the capacity of Four Corners is 1,540 megawatts.

After a law suit by a coalition of environmental organizations, the plant owners and the plaintiffs reached a consent decree in 2015. According to the decree the plant will reduce emissions of nitrogen oxides and sulfur dioxide, pay $1.5 million in civil penalties and $6.7 million in healthcare and other mitigation costs for the people in the affected parts of the Navajo Nation. The law suit was based on pollution of Class I areas under the Clean Air Act in Grand Canyon National Park and 15 other areas of the National Park Service as well as hazardous conditions for health of neighbors of the plant.

Decommissioning
In January 2020, Arizona Public Service announced it would be decommissioning the Four Corners Generating Station by the end of 2031, seven years ahead of the originally scheduled closure date of 2038.

See also
List of largest power stations in the United States

References

Energy infrastructure completed in 1963
Energy infrastructure completed in 1964
Energy infrastructure completed in 1969
Energy infrastructure completed in 1970
Coal-fired power stations in New Mexico
Buildings and structures in San Juan County, New Mexico
Navajo Nation
Arizona Public Service